Tipo-Tipo, officially the Municipality of Tipo-Tipo (Tausūg: Lupah Tipo-Tipo; Chavacano: Municipalidad de Tipo-Tipo), is a 3rd class municipality in the province of Basilan, Philippines. According to the 2020 census, it has a population of 25,531 people.

In 2006, the municipalities of Al-Barka and Ungkaya Pukan were created from Tipo-Tipo, reducing its number of barangays from 39 to 11.

Tipo-Tipo was the site of the 2007 Basilan beheading incident where Abu Sayyaf bandits beheaded 14 Philippine Marines, as well as two subsequent battles in April 2014 and April 2016.

Geography

Barangays
Tipo-Tipo is politically subdivided into 11 barangays.

Climate

Demographics

In the 2020 census, Tipo-Tipo had a population of 25,531.

Economy

See also
Ingatun-Lukman Gumuntul Istarul, mayor
Jakaria Tanasalun Emmo, Vice Mayor (1980-1986)

References

External links
Tipo-Tipo Profile at the DTI Cities and Municipalities Competitive Index
[ Philippine Standard Geographic Code]

Municipalities of Basilan
Establishments by Philippine presidential decree